Lenape are a Native American people.

Lenape may also refer to:

Lenape, Kansas, an unincorporated community in Leavenworth County
Lenape, Pennsylvania, an unincorporated community in Chester County
Lenape potato, a potato variety
Lenape High School, which is in New Jersey
Lenape Middle School, Doylestown, Pennsylvania
USS Lenape (ID-2700) was a troop transport for the United States Navy in 1918, during World War I